Hvaler (also known as Maria) is a Norwegian drama written by Arne Berggren, produced by Rubicon TV for TV 2. The first season of the series was shown on TV 2 from September to December 2008, while the second season was shown from September to November 2010. Recording of the first season took place in Hvaler during the period May to October 2008, while the second season was recorded in 2009.

The series won the award for best miniseries (Best Mini-series) during the Seoul International Drama Awards 2009, under the name of Maria.

Cast

Episodes

Series overview

Season 1

Season 2

References

External links
 

2008 Norwegian television series debuts
Norwegian drama television series
Lesbian-related television shows
2010 Norwegian television series endings
2000s Norwegian television series
2010s Norwegian television series